Frederick Barton Wolf (April 12, 1922 – January 5, 1999) was bishop of the Episcopal Diocese of Maine from 1968 to 1986.

Early Years and priesthood
Wolf was born in Cedar Rapids, Iowa. He graduated from Grinnell College and Seabury-Western Theological Seminary. He was ordained deacon in 1945, priest in 1946. He served as priest-in-charge of Holy Trinity Church in Belvidere, Illinois from 1946 till 1950 and Rector of St Christopher Church from 1950 till 1954 when he was appointed Dean of St John's Cathedral in Quincy, Illinois. He was also associate secretary for leadership training in the department of Christian education for the Executive Council from 1957 till 1959. In 1959 he became Rector of St Peter's in Bennington, Vermont. While in Bennington, he was closely associated with the Parish Training Program of the Province of New England, a summer field work program for seminarians. He was also president of the standing committee of the Diocese of Vermont, a member of the Diocesan Council and a delegate to the Vermont Church Council. He also served as a deputy to General Convention and is a consultant to the convention's Liturgical Commission.

Episcopacy
On June 14, 1968, Wolf was elected Bishop of Maine on the 13th ballot. He was consecrated on October 4, 1968, in the Cathedral of St. Luke in Portland. The co-consecrators were Walter H. Gray, Bishop of Connecticut, and John Seville Higgins, Bishop of Rhode Island.

Family
Wolf married Barbara Buckley and had three daughters.

References

External links 
Bishop Wolf of Maine Dies
Retired Bishop of Episcopal Diocese Dies

1922 births
1999 deaths
20th-century American Episcopalians
Episcopal bishops of Maine
20th-century American clergy